Gregorius Sickinger (1558–1631) was a Swiss painter, draughtsman, and engraver.

Sickinger was born in Solothurn. He had 5 brothers and sisters, and was re-married after the death of his first wife. Sickinger worked primarily with woodcuts often used in book illustrations. He died penniless in 1631.

There is a Gregor Sickinger street in Fribourg in his honour.

References
This article was initially translated from the German Wikipedia.

16th-century Swiss painters
Swiss male painters
17th-century Swiss painters
1558 births
1631 deaths
People from Solothurn